Onychohydrus is a genus of beetles in the family Dytiscidae. The genus is found in Australia, Tasmania, and New Zealand's North Island. The genus consists of these two species:

 Onychohydrus hookeri (White, 1846)
 Onychohydrus scutellaris (Germar, 1848)

References

Dytiscidae genera